Anandan kumari is executive committee member and veteran leader of Tamil Nadu congress committee.Perumthalivar Kamarajar awardee of the year 2021.

Member of Parliament 
He was elected to the Lok Sabha from Nagercoil constituency as an Indian National Congress candidate in 1977 election, but was defeated in the 1996 and 1998 elections. He also served as the president of Tamil Nadu Congress Committee.

Member of Legislative Assembly 
Ananthan was a Member of the Legislative Assembly.  He floated a new party called " Gandhi Kamaraj National Congress" breaking from Janatha party and had alliance with  AIDMK in 1980 byelection contesting 10 seats and won 6 of them. He was elected to the Tamil Nadu legislative assembly as a Gandhi Kamaraj National Congress candidate from Thiruvottiyur constituency in 1980 election from Radhapuram constituency in the 1984 election. He was elected as an Indian National Congress candidate from Sathankulam constituency in the 1989 and 1991 elections.

Gandhi Kamaraj National Congress 
Ananthan floated Gandhi Kamaraj National Congress, a new political party breaking away from Congress. He began the party as he said he was frustrated by National Congress leaders' neglect of the Tamil Nadu state party unit and workers.Having failed to make any progress in elections, it merged with the Indian National Congress in 1977.

Thondar Congress 
Ananthan floated Thondar Congress, a new political party breaking away from Congress. He began the party as he said he was frustrated by National Congress leaders' neglect of the Tamil Nadu state party unit and workers. Having failed to make any progress in elections, it merged with the Indian National Congress in 2001.

Personal life
Ananthan's youngest brother H. Vasanthakumar was an entrepreneur and a politician.

His daughter is physician turned politician Tamilisai Soundararajan who has been appointed as Governor of Telangana and Puducherry.

References 

Tamil Nadu politicians
Living people
India MPs 1977–1979
Lok Sabha members from Tamil Nadu
Indian National Congress (Organisation) politicians
Indian National Congress politicians
People from Kanyakumari district
1933 births
Tamil Nadu MLAs 1985–1989
Tamil Nadu MLAs 1991–1996
Janata Party politicians